David MacAllister Turner, Sr. (May 17, 1917 – September 8, 2012) was a former Republican member of the Pennsylvania House of Representatives.

References

Republican Party members of the Pennsylvania House of Representatives
2012 deaths
1917 births